Theresa Hannig (born 21 June 1984) is a German science fiction author.

Biography
Hannig was born in Munich on 21 June 1984 though she was raised in Kottgeisering and Fürstenfeldbruck. Hannig attended the University of Munich where she studied Political Science and went on to a varied career in software development, project management and as a lighting designer. She is married with two children. In 2016 her then unpublished novel Die Optimierer was awarded the first Stefan Lübbe Prize. This led to a publishing contract and her novel won the Seraph Award for Speculative Fiction in 2018 for the best debut novel. The sequel was published in 2019. Hannig has a mystery thriller published in 2021.

Hannig's work deals with data protection, basic income and automation. She gives talks on science fiction and digitization. She led a petition to increasing visibility of women and non-binary people on the German Wikipedia.

Works
 Die Optimierer Bastei Lübbe, Köln 2017. ISBN 9783404208876
 Die Imperfect Bastei Lübbe, Köln 2019. ISBN 9783404209477
 König und Meister Edition Roter Drache, 2021. ISBN 9783968150147

Sources

1984 births
Living people
Writers from Munich
21st-century German women writers
German science fiction writers
Wikipedia people